Hobo Flats is an album by American jazz organist Jimmy Smith arranged by Oliver Nelson. It was Smith's second album for Verve Records.

On the Billboard 200 Hobo Flats peaked at number 11, and the title track was released as a single and peaked at number 69.

Billboard magazine included Hobo Flats in its 'Pop Spotlight' for the week of 27 April 1963.

Reception

The Allmusic review by Steve Leggett awarded the album 3½ stars stating that

Track listing
 "Hobo Flats" (Oliver Nelson) – 4:46
 "Blueberry Hill" (Al Lewis, Vincent Rose, Larry Stock) – 4:56
 "Walk Right In" (Gus Cannon, Erik Darling, Hosea Woods) – 3:32
 "Trouble in Mind" (Richard M. Jones) – 4:23
 "The Preacher" (Horace Silver) – 6:16
 "Meditation (Meditação)" (Norman Gimbel, Antonio Carlos Jobim, Newton Mendonça) – 3:06
 "I Can't Stop Loving You" (Don Gibson) – 4:27

Personnel

Musicians
 Jimmy Smith – organ
 George Dorsey, Phil Woods – alto saxophone
Al Cohn, Zoot Sims – tenor saxophone
Jimmy Cleveland, Urbie Green, Quentin Jackson – trombone
Joe Newman, Ernie Royal, Clark Terry – trumpet
George Duvivier, Milt Hinton – double bass
Jimmy Johnson, Jr., John "Dandy" Rodriguez, Bill Rodriquez – drums
Buddy Lucas - harmonica (Track 1 only)

Technical
 Creed Taylor – producer
 Oliver Nelson – arranger, conductor
 Val Valentin – director of engineering
 Bob Simpson – engineer
 Kevin Reeves – digital remastering
 Hollis King – art direction
 Isabelle Wong – package design
 Chuck Stewart – photography
 Del Shields – liner notes
 Andy Kman – production coordination
 Ray Hall – re-recording engineer
 Harry Weinger – reissue supervisor\

Chart performance

Album

Single

References

1963 albums
Albums arranged by Oliver Nelson
Albums produced by Creed Taylor
Jimmy Smith (musician) albums
Verve Records albums